The 2015 NBL Canada draft was held on November 28, 2015, at the Athlete Institute in Mono, Ontario. During the event, National Basketball League of Canada (NBL) teams took turns selecting amateur college basketball players. The new expansion team, the Niagara River Lions, were awarded the first overall pick and selected Erik Copes, a power forward from George Mason in the NCAA Division I. The eighth overall pick in the draft was defunct, due to the folding of the Mississauga Power team during the offseason. Both the River Lions and the Halifax Hurricanes made their first draft picks in franchise history. Matt McLean, out of Bishop's University, was the sole Canadian to be selected. The rest of the field was made up of Americans.

Draft selections

References

External links 

National Basketball League of Canada Draft
Draft
NL Canada draft
NBL Canada draft
Basketball in Ontario
Events in Ontario
Dufferin County